The city district Zell am See-Süd (South Zell am See), official Schüttdorf, is the most populous part, with approximately 5,400 inhabitants, of the district capital Zell am See.

Commercial

Present and future  
The Prof. Ferdinand Porsche-Street, and the Gletschermoosstreet was joined in the spring of 2008 with a new roadway.

Kitzsteinhorn-Street 
As the largest part of Zell am See, South Zell am See has experienced a boom through the settlement of different companies. The Kitzsteinhorn-Street has developed in recent years to a shopping street.

Infrastructure 
In South Zell am See, there is a seniors housing complex, a youth center, a sports complex, a beach and tennis courts.

Education 
In South Zell am See, there is one elementary school, a grammar school, a special school, a polytechnic, a commercial college and a business school: 
 Schüttdorf Elementary school (Prof. Dr. Ferdinand Porsche memorial school)
 General special
 Zell am See Technical school
 Zell am See Grammar School
 Federal Commercial

Transportation

Zell am See Airport 
There is an airport (ICAO LOWZ) with paved runway, as well as a hangar, terminal and tower. Currently, the airfield for sport and private jets will be used. There are plans to rebuild the airfield.

PLB 
The city district South Zell am See is connected to the network of Pinzgauer Lokalbahn (operators SLB).

Stops of the PLB in South Zell: 
Tischlerhäusl
Kitzsteinhornstraße
Areitbahn

Zell am See